Medvedie is a village and municipality in Svidník District in the Prešov Region of north-eastern Slovakia.

History
In historical records the village was first mentioned in 1572.

Geography
The municipality lies at an altitude of 378 metres and covers an area of 5.069 km2. It has a population of about 55 people.

References

External links
 
 
https://web.archive.org/web/20071027094149/http://www.statistics.sk/mosmis/eng/run.html

Villages and municipalities in Svidník District
Šariš